is the seventh story arc of the Japanese manga series JoJo's Bizarre Adventure, written and illustrated by Hirohiko Araki. Set in the United States in 1890, it stars Johnny Joestar, a paraplegic former jockey who desires to regain the use of his legs, and Gyro Zeppeli, a disgraced former executioner who seeks to win amnesty for a child on death row. They, along with others, compete in a titular cross-country horse race for a $50 million grand prize, but the race has a hidden agenda behind it.

Originally the first 23 chapters (4 volumes) were serialized in the shōnen manga magazine Weekly Shōnen Jump in 2004 simply under the title Steel Ball Run. Although the character's names and abilities were obviously related to the series, it was unclear if the story was actually part of JoJo's Bizarre Adventure due to perceived conflicting continuity. However, when the series moved to the monthly seinen manga magazine Ultra Jump in 2005, it was officially announced as part 7 of JoJo's Bizarre Adventure, but set in an alternate universe, like the following arc, JoJolion.

Steel Ball Run has been universally acclaimed for its art, characters, and story, with some even regarding it as the best part in the entire JoJo's Bizarre Adventure series. The 95 chapters were combined into 24 tankōbon volumes (volumes 81–104 of the entire series), following the trend set by the previous part, Stone Ocean, of starting over the volume count. A couple of chapters were adapted into a "Vomic" series, which has voice actors act over the manga pages as they are shown on screen.

Plot
In September 1890, racing jockeys from all over the world flock to the United States to take part in the Steel Ball Run, a cross-country horse race from San Diego to New York City with a fifty-million dollar grand prize. A paraplegic named Johnny Joestar enters the race to learn about the mysterious Spin ability of a former Neapolitan executioner named Gyro Zeppeli, who temporarily restored Johnny's mobility. Though they begin the race as rivals, Johnny and Gyro become friends as they travel through the wilderness while fending off various assassins, terrorists, outlaws, and other violent competitors. Although the Steel Ball Run is organized by the eccentric oil tycoon Steven Steel, United States president Funny Valentine has engineered the race to serve as a front for collecting the scattered pieces of a 1900-year-old corpse known as the Holy Corpse (heavily implied to be the body of Jesus Christ). Valentine intends to reassemble the Corpse and gain limitless power through it on behalf of his nation, having already obtained the Corpse's heart.

After Johnny and Gyro encounter another piece of the Holy Corpse, it is absorbed into Johnny's body and he develops the evolving Stand Tusk, allowing him to fend off one of Valentine's subordinates. Later, they meet the spiteful and ambitious racer Diego Brando who obtains one of the Corpse's two eyes, while Gyro gains the other. Johnny and Gyro continue the race, encountering other racers, gaining and losing Corpse parts, and enhancing their Spin techniques along the way.

Meanwhile, Steven's wife Lucy tries to uncover and foil Valentine's plan with later assistance from another racer, Hot Pants. However, Valentine discovers Lucy and takes her captive after she fuses with the Corpse and seemingly becomes pregnant with the Corpse's head. Diego and Hot Pants ally against and fight Valentine on a moving train, but are overpowered and killed by the president and his dimension-traversing Stand Dirty Deeds Done Dirt Cheap. Lucy begins to fully merge with the completed Corpse, enhancing Valentine's stand with a new misfortune-redirecting ability known as D4C Love Train. Johnny and Gyro arrive and attempt to battle the seemingly-invulnerable Valentine, only for Valentine to overpower them both and kill Gyro. Mourning his mentor and friend, Johnny realizes how to achieve the perfect form of the Spin technique, enhances his Stand, and overwhelms Valentine with his new power. Valentine attempts to fake his surrender, but Johnny kills him, avenging his companion but putting an end to any hope of his return.

The Holy Corpse separates from Lucy, only to be stolen by an unknown antagonist. Pursuing the thief into the final stage of the Steel Ball Run, Johnny is shocked to find that it is an alternate instance of Diego Brando taken from a parallel dimension by Valentine, wielding a time-stopping Stand known as THE WORLD. Johnny attempts to engage the alternate Diego, who defeats him with his own attack and easily takes first place in the race. The alternate Diego brings the Corpse to Trinity Church, only to run into Lucy, who annihilates him by forcing him to merge with the severed head of the original Diego.

As the race ends, first place is awarded to the carefree Pocoloco, who had slept through the start of the race and only caught up by sheer luck, while Steven Steel arrives to save Johnny. Valentine's death is covered up as retirement from public life, with concerns over the race placated by the donation of the prize money to charitable causes. Johnny, having regained his ability to walk through the power of his Stand and the Spin, leaves America to return Gyro's body to his family. On the boat, he meets the Japanese runner-up racer Norisuke Higashikata. Johnny later marries Norisuke's daughter Rina, leading to the events of Part 8, JoJolion.

Characters

 , born Jonathan Joestar, is a former horse racer from Danville, Kentucky, who is paralyzed from the waist down. He participates in the Steel Ball Run to follow Gyro Zeppeli in the hopes of using his Spin technique to regain use of his legs. He uses the Stand Tusk, which allows him to shoot his finger nails as bullets. As the race continues and Johnny begins to understand the Spin, Tusk evolves into different forms, termed ACTs, with differing capabilities, similarly to Koichi Hirose's Echoes.
 , born Julius Caesar Zeppeli, is a disgraced magistrate and executioner from the Kingdom of Naples, who participates in the Steel Ball Run to free a boy who he believes has been wrongfully convicted. He is a master of a mystical art called the Spin, which channels rotational energy through Steel Balls to produce all manner of effects. Gyro has an acute knowledge of the human body, which combines with his precision, quick judgment, and knowledge of Spin to make him a skilled combatant. Gyro eventually unlocks the Stand-like Spin technique Ball Breaker, which allows him to induce senescence in whatever his Steel Balls hit.
  is a fourteen-year-old girl married to Steel Ball Run promoter . Steven took the original idea for the Steel Ball Run from Lucy, and later married her both out of gratitude and to save her and her father from the mafia. After learning of the Holy Corpse, Lucy allies herself with Johnny and Gyro to put an end to the president's ambitions. She later obtains the Stand Ticket to Ride, which allows her tears to take solid form and alter the luck of whatever they touch, before eventually being forced to fuse with the Corpse itself.
  is a Steel Ball Run participant from the United Kingdom, and one of Johnny and Gyro's fiercest rivals. After being transformed into a dinosaur by a Stand named Scary Monsters, he inherited the ability for himself by seizing the Holy Corpse's left eye. Diego utilizes Scary Monsters more directly than his predecessor, often partially turning himself into a dinosaur or using miniature dinosaurs to pursue his targets.
  is a Steel Ball Run participant from the United States. Having sacrificed her younger brother to a grizzly bear in her youth, Hot Pants became a nun to atone for her sins before eventually entering the race. She uses the Stand Cream Starter, which takes the form of a spray bottle that can spray human flesh as a foam-like substance that can fuse with people's bodies.
  is a former Neapolitan royal guard who was exiled for murdering his sister's abusive husband. He is hired by Funny Valentine alongside Magent Magent to attack Johnny and Gyro. Like Gyro, Wekapipo is not a Stand User, but instead uses Steel Balls imbued with the Spin. His special technique, referred to as Wrecking Ball, allows him to release smaller spheres from one of his Steel Balls if it is blocked or misses, which cause anyone who touches them to become unable to see or feel anything to their left side.
   is a cowboy and bounty hunter introduced as a leading competitor in the Steel Ball Run. During the first stages of the race, Tim becomes one of Johnny and Gyro's allies while pursuing a murderous competitor. Later, Tim returns to save Lucy after she infiltrates a government building, out of his own romantic feelings for her. Mountain Tim is a Stand User who is able to transport his body through his lasso thanks to his Stand, Oh! Lonesome Me.
  joins the race after a fortune-teller foretells great luck in his immediate future. Through that sheer luck, he becomes one of the fiercest competitors of the race. Though Pocoloco is a Stand User, his Stand, Hey Ya!, only demonstrates the ability to encourage and suggest ideas to him, relying upon his natural luck.
  (real name Soundman) is a competitor in the Steel Ball Run race. Sandman comes from a Native American tribe in the Arizona desert. Despite being ostracized for adopting the ways of American society, he hopes that winning the race will earn him enough money to buy back his ancestors' land. In addition to becoming one of the fiercest competitors in the race thanks to his running technique, Sandman wields the Stand In a Silent Way, which allows him to create three-dimensional constructs out of sounds and apply their associated effects to whatever they touch. He is eventually hired by Funny Valentine and partnered with Diego Brando, with orders to assassinate Johnny and Gyro.
  is the 23rd President of the United States, and a former soldier. He uses the Stand Dirty Deeds Done Dirt Cheap, which allows him to travel or send things between alternate dimensions when pressed or positioned between two objects, with any counterparts in the same dimension being forced to merge with each other and be destroyed. Valentine later acquires an additional ability named D4C Love Train, which produces a gap in space that redirects any attack toward Valentine to somewhere else in the world.
 The Boomboom Family are a family of criminals hired by a foreign country to assassinate Johnny and Gyro. At the beginning of the race, they kill several competitors, attracting the attention of Mountain Tim. The family shares a single Stand, Tomb of the Boom, which gives each of them unique abilities related to magnetism.
  is the patriarch and leader of the family, his wife having left the family to work as a prostitute. He is murderous and greedy, and he and his two sons kill several racers in the early stages of the race. Benjamin's version of Tomb of the Boom allows him to sink metal objects into his skin, which he can disguise himself with or release to attack unsuspecting victims.
  is one of Benjamin's two sons and displays the same murderous tendencies as his father, in addition to a deep fascination with erotic asphyxiation. Andre's version of Tomb of the Boom allows him to materialize sharp objects from within anyone he touches.
  is the youngest and least knowledgeable of the family, lacking basic mathematical skills and suffering constant verbal abuse from his father and brother. L.A.'s version of Tomb of the Boom allows him to immobilize his enemy using iron sand before killing them by extracting the iron from their blood.
 Valentine's Subordinates are Stand Users who support president Funny Valentine's ambitions of obtaining the Holy Corpse, with most coming into conflict with Johnny and Gyro over a part of the coveted relic.
  is a terrorist from the Kingdom of Naples who participates in the Steel Ball Run. Having heard of Gyro Zeppeli's participation, he attacks Gyro in the Rocky Mountains as revenge against his home country's king. Oyecomova uses the stand Listen to My Rhythm, which allows him to create and attach timed automatic grenades to anything he touches.
  is a deranged young boy hired by Valentine to find the Corpse's left arm. His Stand, Wired, allows him to release two hooks from his mouth, which can hook, attack, and reel in targets through any body of water.
  is a geologist hired by Funny Valentine to attack Gyro and Johnny in the Rocky Mountains. Ferdinand carries the belief that the Earth brings prosperity to those who respect it, claiming that the dinosaurs were wiped out due to their lack of respect for the planet. Fittingly, he is the original user of the Stand Scary Monsters, which gives him the ability to turn living beings into dinosaurs under his command.
  is a solitary gunslinger hired by Funny Valentine to attack the racers in hopes of obtaining their parts of the Holy Corpse. In his youth, Ringo's family was murdered by a man who Ringo barely managed to kill, an act that inspired Ringo to continue growing spiritually and enter into a "real man's world" by dueling others. Ringo uses the Stand Mandom, which allows him to rewind time by six seconds by adjusting his watch.
 , one of the president's bodyguards, is tasked with tracking and eliminating an unknown intruder. Blackmore's wearable Stand, Catch the Rainbow, lets him interact with falling raindrops as if they were solid, allowing him to use them as projectiles, walk atop the falling rain, and even seal his own wounds.
 The  are assassins hired by Valentine to kill Johnny and Gyro in order to obtain their parts of the Holy Corpse. The entire group shares a single Stand, Tatoo You!, which allows each of the eleven members to phase into and hide inside their comrades.
  is Funny Valentine's personal bodyguard. When Lucy Steel and Hot Pants infiltrate the President's residence in Chicago, he battles Hot Pants in order to protect Valentine. His Stand, Tubular Bells, allows him to create sentient balloon dogs out of metal that pursue and burrow into a specific target.
  is deployed alongside Wekapipo to attack Johnny and Gyro near Lake Michigan. After being incapacitated and losing an eye, he returns to civilization to attack Steven Steel, prompting a duel with his former partner. Magent Magent wields the Stand 20th Century Boy, which allows him to transfer any damage or affliction he faces into the ground while he is in a squatting position.
  is a veteran of the American Civil War and an agent of President Valentine. Having failed to raise an alarm for his troops in a crucial battle during the war, Axl RO attacks Hot Pants, Gyro, and Johnny near Gettysburg, Pennsylvania to cleanse himself of his longstanding guilt and steal the near-complete Holy Corpse. Axl is the Stand User of Civil War, a Stand that revives the subjects of its victims' guilt in physical form, up to and including its own user.
  is an agent of Funny Valentine who is sent to distract Gyro from Johnny's attempted assassination. D-I-S-C-O wields the stand Chocolate Disco, which allows him to teleport objects around a grid projected onto the ground in front of him.
 Following his defeat at Johnny's hands, Valentine summons an alternate Diego Brando from a parallel dimension in the hopes of defeating Johnny, securing the Holy Corpse, and bestowing his country with eternal prosperity. Despite having a similar personality and ruthlessness to his counterpart, the alternate Diego firmly allies himself with the late president and meticulously arranges a plan to eliminate his rival for good. The alternate Diego wields the invincible Stand THE WORLD, which possesses the ability to stop time for everyone except its user for around five seconds.
  is a large tree near Milwaukee that serves as its own Stand and user. Those who drop anything near the tree will be met by a guardian bearing the same name as the tree, who will offer a choice between the dropped item and one of greater value (akin to the fable of The Honest Woodcutter). While liars meet an immediate end at the tree's hands, honest people face a second trial after departing: if the unfortunate party fails to trade, consume, or otherwise use up everything they obtained from the tree by sunset, they are absorbed into the tree itself and forced to serve as one of its rotating guardians.

Production

Written and illustrated by Hirohiko Araki, Steel Ball Run was originally serialized in Shueisha's shōnen manga anthology Weekly Shōnen Jump from January 19 to October 16, 2004.  It was later moved to Shueisha's monthly seinen magazine Ultra Jump on March 19, 2005, and ran until April 19, 2011. Araki found that the new, monthly schedule with longer chapters suited him better, as he was not as restricted in what he could draw and no longer had to write stories with momentum building up excitement for the next week's chapter, and had more flexibility to draw at his own pace. Araki described the manga's theme as "seeking for satisfaction". Like with other parts of JoJo's Bizarre Adventure, Araki also used "an affirmation that humanity is wonderful" as a theme, which he explained as a description for humanity's ability to grow and overcome hardships through one's strength and spirit, portrayed through people succeeding in fights through their own actions, without relying on machines or gods.

Because the series follows a race across America, Araki had to split his research into three trips: one from the West Coast to the deserts, one from the Great Plains to the Mississippi River and Chicago, and one to New York. He said that it would have been impossible to get an understanding for the vast scale without having gone there personally, describing the scenery of the Midwest as endless and unchanging. The feeling of distance made him think that if an enemy had approached, the open landscape would have meant that he could not have escaped due to a lack of places to hide, an experience he found useful when drawing the manga.

Like other protagonists in the series, Johnny was designed to symbolize the part's story and setting, and to stand out among the previous protagonists in terms of appearance, clothing, and silhouette. He was not specifically planned to have a disability at the start of the production; rather, his disability was the result of the series' focus on protagonists growing through overcoming hardships, and Araki wanting to create a character who was forced to rely on people and horses during the race and had room to grow both mentally and physically. Valentine was created as part of Araki noticing more and more that good and evil is not always easily distinguishable and taking a greater interest in the motivations for people who do bad things. He noted that Valentine's patriotism and goals seemed just and might line up with leaders in the real world, and that it is his sacrifice of powerless people to reach his goals that make him evil and completely unsuitable as a protagonist. The concept of having the United States president fighting the main characters came from when Araki saw the film Independence Day, and liked the idea of a president who fights.

Chapters

Original volumization
The first chapter title of each pair is the title that is used in the volumization of Steel Ball Run. The second title is the title used in the original serialization in Weekly Shonen Jump and Ultra Jump.

2017 release

Reception
Kono Manga ga Sugoi! recommended Steel Ball Run as a good place to start for people who have not read previous parts, due to how it effectively serves as a reboot of the JoJo's Bizarre Adventure series, and appreciated how its move to the monthly seinen magazine Ultra Jump enabled Araki to write longer stories and depict things that would have been difficult to do in a shōnen magazine. Erkael of Manga-News called the manga one of the best in the series, and said that it does not disappoint the reader at any point. Anime News Network called Steel Ball Run an interesting take on the battle manga genre due to its positive portrayal of a hero with a disability, and found it, along with JoJolion, to represent a big shift in the evolution of Araki's art, following his earlier shift from muscle men to thinner characters and fashion.

K. Thor Jensen of Geek.com called the portrayal of Johnny and Gyro's relationship one of the best platonic friendships in comics, citing their transition from rivals to close allies who make sacrifices for one another and help each other with their respective abilities. Erkael liked the high speed and intensity of the story, saying that it was as if Araki wanted the reader to feel like they were part of the race themselves, and how the story eventually opens up to follow several different characters whose paths at times intersect, leading to a world that feels "rich and dense". They wrote that the lack of Stands early in the story, with Gyro instead using steel balls, was surprising but refreshing, and reminiscent of the hamon abilities featured in the first part in the JoJo's Bizarre Adventure series, Phantom Blood; they still enjoyed the shift in focus to Stand abilities later in the story, calling them "original and surprising". Kono Manga ga Sugoi! liked the depiction of the landscapes Johnny and Gyro travel through, calling them "beautiful".

Notes

References

External links
 Official website
 Official Vomic page
 

Alternate history manga
Comics set in the United States
Horse racing in anime and manga
JoJo's Bizarre Adventure
Seinen manga
Shōnen manga
Shueisha manga
Western (genre) anime and manga
Fiction set in 1890
Fiction set in 1891